Rachel Oldroyd was until 2022 the managing editor at the Bureau of Investigative Journalism. She previously worked at The Mail on Sunday, where she launched the Reportage section.

In 2011, she was awarded an Amnesty International UK Media Award for her work on the Iraq war logs.

References

Year of birth missing (living people)
Living people
British investigative journalists
British journalists
Daily Mail journalists